Kedgaon railway station is a small railway station in Pune district, Maharashtra. Its code is KDG. It serves Kedgaon village. The station consists of two platforms.

sachin sabale

References 

Railway stations in Pune district
Pune railway division